Nationality words link to articles with information on the nation's poetry or literature (for instance, Irish or France).

Events
 June 14 – Opening of Shelley Memorial at University College, Oxford (from which the poet was expelled in 1811), designed by Basil Champneys with a reclining nude marble statue of Percy Bysshe Shelley by Edward Onslow Ford
 Founding of Vangiya Sahitya Parishad in Bengal

Works published in English

Canada
 William Wilfred Campbell, The Dread Voyage Poems. Toronto: William Briggs.
 Bliss Carman, Low Tide at Grand Pré
 Mary Jane Katzmann, Frankincense and Myrrh: Selections from the poems of the late Mrs. William Lawson (M.J.K.L.). Harry Piers and Constance Fairbanks ed. Halifax.
 Thomas O'Hagan, In Dreamland and Other Poems
 Charles G. D. Roberts, Songs of the Common Day
 Duncan Campbell Scott, The Magic House and Other Poems
 James Elgin Wetherell, ed. Later Canadian Poems

Ireland
 Douglas Hyde, editor and translator from the Gaelic, The Love Songs of Connacht, Ireland
 W. B. Yeats, Irish poet published in the United Kingdom, The Celtic Twilight, poetry and nonfiction
 W. B. Yeats, Irish poet published in the United Kingdom and Edwin John Ellis, The Works of William Blake, Poetic, Symbolic, and Critical, Quaritch

United Kingdom
 Wilfred Scawen Blunt, published anonymously, Griselda
 Katherine Harris Bradley and Edith Emma Cooper, writing under the pen name "Michael Field", Underneath the Bough
 Robert Bridges, The Humours of the Court: a Comedy; and Other Poems
 Thomas Edward Brown, Old John, and Other Poems
 John Davidson, Fleet Street Eclogues, first series (see also Fleet Street Eclogues 1896)
 W. E. Henley, London Voluntaries; The Song of the Sword; and Other Verses
 George MacDonald, Poetical Works
 Alice Meynell, Poems
 Francis Thompson, Poems, including "The Hound of Heaven"
 W. B. Yeats, Irish poet published in the United Kingdom, The Celtic Twilight, poetry and nonfiction
 W. B. Yeats, Irish poet published in the United Kingdom, and Edwin John Ellis, editors, The Works of William Blake, Poetic, Symbolic, and Critical, Quaritch

United States
 Bliss Carman, Low Tide on Grand Pre, Canadian author published in the United States
 Paul Laurence Dunbar, Oak and Ivy
 Hamlin Garland, Prairie Songs
 Louise Imogen Guiney, A Roadside Harp
 Harriet Monroe, The Columbian Ode
 James Whitcomb Riley, Poems Here at Home

Other in English
 
 Henry Lawson, "Saint Peter", Australia
 Banjo Paterson, "The Geebung Polo Club", first published in The Antipodean, Australia

Works published in other languages
 Carlo Favetti (died 1892), Rime e prose in vernacolo goriziano (Rhimes and Prose in the Vernacular of Gorizia), Friuli
 Francis Jammes, Vers, (also 1892 and 1894); France
 Guido Mazzoni, Voci della vita, Italy
 Saint-Pol-Roux, pen name of Paul Roux, Les Reposoirs de la procession, published starting this year and ending in 1907; France

Awards and honors

Births
Death years link to the corresponding "[year] in poetry" article:
 January 3 – W. N. Hodgson (Edward Melbourne) (killed in action 1916), English war poet
 January 10 – Vicente Huidobro (died 1948), Chilean Creacionismo poet and editor
 January 17 – Evelyn Scott (died 1963), American writer and poet
 January 18 – Jorge Guillén (died 1984), Spanish
 February 11 – Nan Shepherd (died 1981), Scottish novelist and poet
 February 26 – Ivor Richards (died 1979), English literary critic
 March 4 – Ewart Alan Mackintosh (killed in action 1917), English war poet of Scottish ancestry
 March 6 – Motokichi Takahashi 高橋元吉 (died 1965), Japanese, Taishō and Shōwa period poet (surname: Takahashi)
 March 18 – Wilfred Owen (killed in action 1918), English war poet
 March 26 – Richard Church (died 1972), English poet
 July 13 – Evan Morgan, 2nd Viscount Tredegar (died 1949), Welsh poet and occultist
 July 19 – Vladimir Mayakovsky (suicide 1930), Russian poet and playwright
 July 26 – George Grosz (died 1959), German artist and poet
 August 22 – Dorothy Parker (died 1967), American writer, poet and wit
 September 6 or 16 – Robert Nichols (died 1944), English war poet
 September 28 – Giannis Skarimpas (died 1984), Greek
 October 9 – Mário de Andrade (died 1945), Brazilian poet and academic
 October 14 – May Wedderburn Cannan (died 1973), English war poet
 October 26
 Miloš Crnjanski, (died 1977) Serbian poet and novelist
 Thomas MacGreevy (died 1967), Irish poet and director of the National Gallery of Ireland
 November 3 – Arthur Bourinot (died 1969), Canadian poet and lawyer
 December 4 – Herbert Read (born 1968), English anarchist poet and critic of literature and art
 December 6 – Sylvia Townsend Warner (died 1978), English novelist and poet
 December 30 – Gerald Bullett (died 1958), English writer and poet
 Also – Dharanidhar Sharma Koirala (died 1980), Indian, Nepali-language poet

Deaths
Birth years link to the corresponding "[year] in poetry" article:
 January 23 – Phillips Brooks (born 1835), American Episcopal clergyman and hymnwriter
 January 15 – Fanny Kemble (born 1809), English author, poet, playwright and actress
 April 19 – John Addington Symonds (born 1840), English poet and literary critic
 August 5 – Sarah T. Bolton, née Barrett (born 1814), American poet
 December 5 – Matsudaira Katamori 松平容保 (born 1836), Japanese samurai and poet in the last days of the Edo period and the early to mid Meiji period (surname: Matsudaira)
 December 9 – Charles Sangster (born 1822), Canadian poet
 Also – Venmani Mahan Namboodiri (born 1844), Indian, Malayalam-language poet associated with the Venmani School of poetry

See also

 19th century in poetry
 19th century in literature
 List of years in poetry
 List of years in literature
 Victorian literature
 French literature of the 19th century
 Symbolist poetry
 Young Poland (Młoda Polska) a modernist period in Polish  arts and literature, roughly from 1890 to 1918
 Poetry

Notes

19th-century poetry
Poetry